Arabissus or Arabissos, also known as Tripotamos, was a town in ancient Cataonia, then Cappadocia, and later in the Roman province of Armenia Secunda. The Byzantine Emperor Maurice was born there in 539. A cave of the Seven Sleepers is located in the Eshab-ı Kehf Kulliye.

Location 
The town corresponds to present-day Afşin, formerly Yarpuz, in Kahramanmaraş Province, Turkey.

Ecclesiastical history
Arabissus was an episcopal see, a suffragan of Melitene.

Its diocesan bishops included Otreius, who was at the First Council of Constantinople in 381, and Adolius at the Council of Chalcedon in 451, Adelphius, who was a signatory of the 458 letter of the bishops of the province of Armenia II to Byzantine Emperor Leo I the Thracian to protest at the murder of Proterius of Alexandria, the writer Leontius, who came later, and Georgius, who was at the Trullan Council of 692. Michael the Syrian mentions several Jacobite Church bishops of Arabissus of the 7th to the 10th centuries. Its titular bishops include Stephen Peter Alencastre (1924–1940).

Arabissus is now a titular see of the Catholic Church.

References

Attribution
 The entry cites:
Le Quien, Oriens Christianus (1740), I, 449-450

Populated places in ancient Cataonia
Populated places in ancient Cappadocia
Roman towns and cities in Turkey
Catholic titular sees in Asia
Populated places of the Byzantine Empire